(12538) 1998 OH is a stony asteroid, classified as near-Earth object and potentially hazardous asteroid of the Apollo group, approximately 1.8 kilometers (1.1 miles) in diameter. It was discovered on 19 July 1998, by astronomers of the Near-Earth Asteroid Tracking program at the Haleakala Observatory in Hawaii, United States. In 2019, the asteroid came within about 73 lunar distances of Earth.

Numbering and naming 

This minor planet was numbered by the Minor Planet Center on 23 November 1999. As of 2018, it has not been named.

Orbit and classification 

 is a member of the Apollo group of asteroids, which are Earth-crossing asteroids. They are the largest group of near-Earth objects with approximately 10 thousand known members.

It orbits the Sun at a distance of 0.9–2.2 AU in 1 year and 11 months (699 days). Its orbit has an eccentricity of 0.41 and an inclination of 25° with respect to the ecliptic. The body's observation arc begins with a precovery taken at Palomar Observatory in October 1991, more than 7 years prior to its official discovery observation at Haleakala.

Close approaches 

It will pass close to Earth in 2042 and 2132, at a distance of 0.0292 AU and 0.0317 AU, respectively.

Physical characteristics 

In the SMASS classification,  is a common stony S-type asteroid.

Rotation period 

Lightcurve analysis gave a rotation period of 5.154 hours with an alternative period solution of 2.58 hours, or half the period. The asteroid's brightness amplitude is rather low with a maximum between 0.11 and 0.20 magnitude, which is indicative for a spherical rather than elongated shape.

Diameter and albedo 

According to the survey carried out by the NEOWISE mission of NASA's Wide-field Infrared Survey Explorer,  measures 1.663 kilometers in diameter and its surface has an albedo of 0.232. The Collaborative Asteroid Lightcurve Link assumes a standard albedo for stony asteroids of 0.20 and calculates a diameter of 2.06 kilometers based on an absolute magnitude of 15.8.

See also 
List of asteroid close approaches to Earth in 2019

Notes

References

External links 
 (12538) 1998 OH at the EARN Near-Earth Asteroids Data Base
 Asteroid Lightcurve Database (LCDB), query form (info )
 Dictionary of Minor Planet Names, Google books
 Asteroids and comets rotation curves, CdR – Observatoire de Genève, Raoul Behrend
 
 
 

012538
012538
012538
19980719